Orchesiini is a tribe of false darkling beetles in the family Melandryidae. There are at least three genera and about seven described species in Orchesiini.

Genera
These three genera belong to the tribe Orchesiini:
 Lederia Reitter, 1880 g b
 Microscapha LeConte, 1866 g b
 Orchesia Latreille, 1807 g b
Data sources: i = ITIS, c = Catalogue of Life, g = GBIF, b = Bugguide.net

References

Further reading

External links

 

Melandryidae